The Akdala mine is a large in-situ leaching mine located in the southern part of Kazakhstan in Almaty Province. Akdala represents one of the largest uranium reserves in Kazakhstan having estimated reserves of 43.5 million tonnes of ore grading 0.036% uranium.

References 

Uranium mines in Kazakhstan